Asgariyeh Rural District is in the Central District of Pishva County, Tehran province, Iran. At the National Census of 2006, its population (as a part of the former Pishva District of Varamin County) was 14,364 in 3,308 households. There were 10,400 inhabitants in 2,677 households at the following census of 2011, by which time the district had been separated from the county and Pishva County established. At the most recent census of 2016, the population of the rural district was 10,187 in 2,807 households. The largest of its 14 villages was Habibabad, with 2,310 people.

References 

Pishva County

Rural Districts of Tehran Province

Populated places in Tehran Province

Populated places in Pishva County